Nazhiim Harman (born 2 March 1999 in Singapore) is a Singaporean footballer who plays as a centre-back for Singapore Premier League club Geylang International FC. Nazhiim has also played for other Singapore Premier Clubs like Young Lions and Hougang United.

International Statistics

U19 International caps

References

Association football defenders
Living people
Singaporean footballers
1999 births
Young Lions FC players